Gypsonoma obraztsovi is a species of moth of the family Tortricidae. It is found in Iran, Syria, Hungary and Romania.

The wingspan is 10–13 mm. Adults have been recorded on wing in April and May.

The larvae feed on Salix species.

References

Moths described in 1959
Eucosmini
Taxa named by Hans Georg Amsel